Kosmos 772 ( meaning Cosmos 772) was an uncrewed military Soyuz 7K-S test. It was an unsuccessful mission as only one transmitter worked. Only the 166 MHz frequency transmitter operated, all of the other normal Soyuz wavelengths transmitters failed.  The experience from these flights were used in the development of the successor program Soyuz spacecraft the Soyuz 7K-ST.

Mission parameters
Spacecraft: Soyuz 7K-S
Mass: 6750 kg
Crew: None
Launched: September 29, 1975
Landed: October 3, 1975 4:10 UTC
Perigee: 154 km
Apogee: 245 km
Inclination: 51.8 deg
Duration: 3.99 days

Maneuver Summary
193 km X 270 km orbit to 195 km X 300 km orbit. Delta V: 8 m/s.
196 km X 300 km orbit to 196 km X 328 km orbit. Delta V: 8 m/s.

Total Delta V: 16 m/s.

See also

Soyuz 7K-OK
Soyuz TM-25
Cosmos 670
Cosmos 869

References

Kosmos 0772
Kosmos 0772
Kosmos 0772
1975 in the Soviet Union
Spacecraft launched in 1975